Cochylichroa foxcana is a species of tortricid moth in the family Tortricidae, found in North America.

The MONA or Hodges number for Cochylichroa foxcana is 3857.

References

Further reading

 

Tortricinae
Moths described in 1907